"Our Great Virginia" is the regional anthem of the U.S. state of Virginia.

History
It was adopted unanimously by the Virginia Senate as the official state song of Virginia in early July 2015. Sung to the traditional tune "Oh Shenandoah," with music arranged by Jim Papoulis, its lyrics were written by Mike Greenly.

Lyrics
You'll always be our great Virginia.
You're the birthplace of the nation:
Where history was changed forever.
Today, your glory stays, as we build tomorrow.

I fill with pride at all you give us—
Rolling hills, majestic mountains,
From the Shenandoah to the Atlantic,
Rivers wide and forests tall, all in one Virginia.

For each of us here in Virginia,
From farm to city dweller,
All of us, we stand together.
We're yours, we all are yours—
Across our great Virginia.
You'll always be our great Virginia.

References

Virginia
Symbols of Virginia
Songs about Virginia